Rubén Fernández may refer to:

 Rubén Fernández (Argentine footballer) (born 1960), forward for Celta de Vigo
 Rubén Fernández (footballer) (born before 1946), Paraguayan footballer
 Rubén Fernández (cyclist) (born 1991), Spanish cyclist
 Rubén Fernández Aceves (born 1967), Mexican lawyer
 Ruben Fernandez (Spanish footballer) (born 1968), Spanish-born goalkeeper for the Anaheim Splash
 Rubén Fernández-Gil (born 1978), Spanish former tennis player
 Rubén Gabriel Fernández Bonti (born 1980), Uruguayan footballer for Club Sportivo Cerrito

See also
 Rúben Fernandes (born 1986), Portuguese footballer